Laville-aux-Bois is a commune in the Haute-Marne department in north-eastern France.

See also
Communes of the Haute-Marne department

References

Lavilleauxbois